Trophon parodizi is a species of sea snail, a marine gastropod mollusk in the family Muricidae, the murex snails or rock snails.

Distribution
Can be found off of the southern coasts of South America.

References

Gastropods described in 2005
Trophon